The Circuit Trois-Rivières is a street circuit in Trois-Rivières, Quebec, Canada. The circuit has been the home of the annual Grand Prix de Trois-Rivières, the longest-running street race in North America, since 1967.  The circuit is located on the Terrain de l'Exposition (fairgrounds) and is unusual in that it passes through Porte Duplessis, the narrow concrete gateway of the grounds at turn 3.

Throughout its history the circuit has hosted numerous major North American racing series including the American Le Mans Series, the Grand-Am Rolex Sports Car Series, the Trans-Am Series, Can-Am, Indy Lights and Formula Atlantic.

The Grand Prix has been headlined by the NASCAR Pinty's Series since 2007, and from 2014 until 2019 it was expanded to two weekends when it was joined by the FIA World Rallycross Championship and its World RX of Canada race.

Lap Records
The official race lap records at Circuit Trois-Rivières are listed as:

Current series
NASCAR Pinty's Series 
Canadian Touring Car Championship
 Nissan Sentra Cup
 Formula Tour 1600

Former series
SCCA Trans-Am Series (1976, 1979–1985, 1990–1999, 2002–2004, 2011)
SCCA Can-Am Series (1977–1984)
SCCA World Challenge (1993–1999, 2002)
SCCA North American Touring Car Championship (1996)
IMSA American Le Mans Series (2002–2003)
Grand-Am Rolex Sports Car Series (2000–2001)
Grand-Am KONI Sports Car Challenge (2001, 2005–2010)
Atlantic Championship (1974–1983, 1985, 1989–2003, 2008–2009)
IndyCar Indy Lights (1996–1998, 2011–2012)
IndyCar Pro Mazda Championship (2005–2013)
Formula Super Vee (1984)
FIA World Rallycross Championship – World RX of Canada (2014–2019)
AMA Supermoto National Championship Series
Americas Rallycross Championship (2018–2019)
Formula Drift Canada
NASA Challenge Xtreme Elite 
 Elka Superquads
IMSA Prototype Challenge presented by Mazda 
IMSA GT3 Cup Challenge Canada
F3 Americas Championship

Past winners

American Le Mans Series

Can-Am Series

CASC/SCCA/CART/IMSA Atlantic Championship

SCCA Formula Super Vee Championship

Grand American Road Racing Championship

NASCAR Pinty's Series

Trans-Am Series

SCCA Spec Racer Ford Pro Series

CART Firestone/Dayton Indy Lights

IndyCar Firestone Indy Lights

FIA World Rallycross Championship

References

External links

NASCAR Track Page
Ultimate Racing History - Circuit Trois-Rivières
Racing Sports Cars - Trois-Rivières - List of Races
Circuit Trois-Rivieres race results at Racing-Reference

Sports venues in Trois-Rivières
Road racing venues in Canada
NASCAR tracks
American Le Mans Series circuits
Motorsport in Canada
World Rallycross circuits
1967 establishments in Quebec